Juan Ignacio Samperio Montaño (born 4 October 1957) is a Mexican politician affiliated with the Convergence. As of 2013 he served as Deputy of both the LX and LXII Legislatures of the Mexican Congress representing the State of Mexico.

References

1957 births
Living people
Politicians from the State of Mexico
Citizens' Movement (Mexico) politicians
21st-century Mexican politicians
Deputies of the LXII Legislature of Mexico
Members of the Chamber of Deputies (Mexico) for the State of Mexico